The Federal Health Agency was a federal government agency and the central research institution for public health in Germany. It was founded in 1876, named the Imperial Health Agency. It was succeeded by the Reichsgesundheitsamt in 1918 and by the Bundesgesundheitsamt in 1952 (both meaning Federal Health Agency). The agency was dissolved in 1994, and its responsibilities transferred to three institutions, the Federal Institute for Drugs and Medical Devices, the Robert Koch Institute and the Federal Institute for Health Consumer Protection and Veterinary Medicine.

References

German federal agencies
Government health agencies of Germany
Medical and health organisations based in Berlin
1876 establishments in Germany